A sangre fría (English language: In Cold Blood) is a 1947 Argentine murder thriller film directed by Daniel Tinayre and written by Luis Saslavsky.

Cast
Tito Alonso
Amelia Bence
Ricardo Castro Ríos
Helena Cortesina ....  Linda Moreno
Floren Delbene
Carmen Giménez ....  Mujer en hotel
Antonia Herrero
Ángel Laborde ....  Hombre en estación de servicio
Marcelo Lavalle ....  Transpunte
Carmen Llambí ....  Monja
Mercedes Llambí ....  Enfermera
Pedro López Lagar
Domingo Mania ....  Sr. Dupont
José Maurer ....  Doctor
Luis Otero ....  Comisario Valdez
Juan Pecci ....  Farmacéutico
Ilde Pirovano
Elvira Quiroga
Domingo Sapelli
Nicolás Taricano ....  José

Release

The film was released  on 5 September 1962.

The Argentine Academy of Cinematography Arts and Sciences gave the Best Actress award to Amelia Bence and the Best individual production award to Luis Saslavsky for this film.

References

External links
 
 NY Times plot description
Gallery

1947 films
1940s Spanish-language films
Films directed by Daniel Tinayre
1940s crime thriller films
Argentine crime thriller films
Argentine black-and-white films
1940s Argentine films